The York park and ride is a park and ride network in the cathedral city of York, England, with sites operated by the City of York Council and bus services operated by First York. It is the largest park and ride network in the United Kingdom, with 4,970 car spaces across six sites: Askham Bar, Grimston Bar, Monks Cross, Poppleton Bar, Rawcliffe Bar and York Designer Outlet.

History

Bus services have been operated by First York, under contract to the City of York Council, since the late 1990s. In June 2016, the park and ride contract was put up for tender. However, as none of the bids met the council's criteria, First York was granted a twelve-month extension, until January 2018, with the intention of commencing a fresh tender process. In January 2018, First York was awarded a further seven-year contract to operate the park and ride network.

In June 1990, the first permanent park and ride site opened at Askham Bar. Four years later, a second site was opened at Grimston Bar, near a junction with the A64.

In November 1998, York Designer Outlet was opened, with a park and ride service commencing shortly after.

In February 2000, a 900-space site at Rawcliffe Bar commenced operation, located a junction to the A19.

In July 2004, a site was opened at Monks Cross. In 2014. services were extended to serve the nearby Vangarde Shopping Park, with fully-electric single-deck Optare Versa vehicles introduced into service the following year.

In July 2008, a fleet of 17 Wright Eclipse Urban bodied Volvo B7RLE single-deck vehicles were introduced, with 25 articulated Mercedes-Benz Citaro arriving the following year. The delivery saw the replacement of Wright Eclipse Metro bodied Volvo B7Ls and articulated Wright Eclipse Fusion bodied Volvo B7LA single-deck vehicles formerly allocated to the network, which were introduced at the turn of the decade.

In June 2014, the site at Askham Bar was expanded and relocated to a new 1,100-space site – as part of a £22 million project. In the same month, a new site was opened at Poppleton Bar, with services operated by a fleet of fully-electric Optare Versa.

Following an order in May 2019, a fleet of 21 fully-electric Optare MetroDecker double-deck vehicles were introduced into service in July 2020.

In March 2022, it was confirmed by the Department for Transport that the City of York Council had been awarded a total of £8.4 million to support the purchase of 44 fully electric buses in the city – investment which would bring First York's fully-electric fleet to 77.

Services 
Buses operate frequently, with a frequency of up to every ten minutes (Monday–Saturday daytime). There are seven routes, each of which forms a part of First York's network of local bus services. The network operates with a flat fare (£2.50 single, £3.50 return) between all park and ride sites and the city centre, as well as offering a range of season tickets, which are valid for use on all First York services.

As of May 2022, the below park and ride bus services are operated by First York:

Fleet and operations

As of May 2022, park and ride services are operated solely by First York, with operations based at the company's James Street depot. Vehicles are branded in a dedicated dark blue and gold livery. Prior to rebranding, vehicles were branded in a silver livery, with the fully-electric Optare Versa featuring additional green detailing.

Services are currently operated by a combination of diesel-powered Alexander Dennis Enviro200 and articulated Mercedes-Benz Citaro single-deck vehicles, as well as fully-electric Optare MetroDecker double-deck and Optare Versa single-deck vehicles.

Notes

References

External links

York park and ride website

Bus transport brands
FirstGroup bus operators in England
Park and ride schemes in the United Kingdom
Transport in York
1990 establishments in England